Lepidodactylus oorti is a species of gecko, a lizard in the family Gekkonidae. The species is endemic to Indonesia.

Etymology
The specific name, oorti, is in honor of Dutch ornithologist Eduard Daniël van Oort.

Geographic range
L. oorti is found on the Banda, Damar, and Tanimbar Islands in Indonesia.

Reproduction
L. oorti is oviparous.

References

Further reading
Kopstein, "Ph. F." (1926). "Reptilien von den Molukken und den benachbarten Inseln ". Zoologische Mededeelingen 1: 71–112. (Gecko oorti, new species, pp. 77–78). (in German).
Rösler, Herbert (2000). "Kommentierte Liste der rezent, subrezent und fossil bekannten Geckotaxa (Reptilia: Gekkonomorpha) ". Gekkota 2: 28–153. (Lepidodactylus oortii, p. 91). (in German).

Lepidodactylus
Reptiles described in 1926